is a Japanese football player. He plays as a left back for Gamba Osaka in J1 League.

Club career

Born and raised in Osaka, Fujiharu joined local club Gamba Osaka in 2011 after graduating from the Osaka University of Health and Sport Sciences.   He only played 11 league games during his debut campaign but went on to make the left-back position his own in 2012.   He played all 34 league matches that year, however it was not a successful one for his club as they found themselves relegated to J2 League after finishing in 17th place.

Fujiharu was once again an ever present at left back in 2013 and notched a career high total of 4 goals throughout the year as Gamba bounced back at the first time of asking, finishing the season as league champions.   Things got even better in 2014 with Gamba completing the domestic treble; winning the league, J.League Cup and Emperor's Cup.   Fujiharu played 25 league matches and 34 games in total as he rotated the left-back position with Korean full-back Oh Jae-suk.

2015 saw Gamba lift the Japanese Super Cup and Emperor's Cup, defeating Urawa Red Diamonds in both matches.   They also reached the semi-finals of the AFC Champions League before going down to Chinese side Guangzhou Evergrande over 2 legs.   Fujiharu played a career high 54 games across all competitions in 2015.

Gamba failed to add any silverware to their trophy cabinet between 2016 and 2018, however Fujiharu was by now fully established as his club's first choice in the left back position.   He only missed 6 league games across the 2016 and 2017 seasons before a short spell out with injury in 2018 restricted him to just 25 league appearances.

National team career

Fujiharu received his first call up to the Japan national team in March 2015 and made his debut in a 2-0 home victory over Tunisia on March 27.   Later on in the year he was part of the squad which competed in the 2015 EAFF East Asian Cup.   He played once in the 2-1 defeat to North Korea on August 2.   His final international involvement that year came in a World Cup qualifier away to Cambodia on November 17.   He started and played the full 90 minutes in a 2-0 away victory.

In August 2016, he was selected in the Japan Under-23 squad for the 2016 Summer Olympics. At this tournament, he played 2 matches at left back as Japan were eliminated in the group stages after finishing 3rd in Group B.

Club statistics
Last update: 4 December 2021

1 includes J. League Championship, Japanese Super Cup and Suruga Bank Championship appearances.

National team statistics
Last Update:4 February 2019

Honors

Gamba Osaka

J. League Division 1 - 2014
J. League Division 2 - 2013
Emperor's Cup - 2014, 2015
J. League Cup - 2014
Japanese Super Cup - 2015

References

External links

 
 

1988 births
Living people
Osaka University of Health and Sport Sciences alumni
Association football people from Osaka Prefecture
Japanese footballers
Japan international footballers
J1 League players
J2 League players
Gamba Osaka players
Footballers at the 2016 Summer Olympics
Olympic footballers of Japan
People from Higashiōsaka
Association football defenders